Curtis Julian Jones (born 30 January 2001) is an English professional footballer who plays as a midfielder for  club Liverpool.

Early life
Jones was born in Liverpool, Merseyside, and grew up in the Toxteth area of the city.

Club career

Early career

Jones joined Liverpool at the age of nine. After making his U23s debut in January 2018, Jones signed his first professional contract on 1 February 2018.

He was named in Liverpool's squad for the Premier League match against Everton on 7 April 2018 and was included on the substitute bench without making an appearance.

Jones featured prominently for Liverpool during pre-season ahead of the 2018–19 season. Manager Jürgen Klopp praised his mobility and dribbling skills.

Jones made his first-team debut on 7 January 2019, in the FA Cup third round against Wolverhampton Wanderers.

2019–20 season
Jones made his season debut and played in his second competitive match for the club on 25 September 2019 in an EFL Cup match against Milton Keynes Dons. He was chosen as Man of the Match.

He then scored the winning penalty in Liverpool's EFL Cup penalty shoot-out victory against Arsenal. He made his Premier League debut on 7 December 2019, from the substitute's bench, against AFC Bournemouth.

On 5 January 2020, Jones was part of a Liverpool team largely made up of teenagers and reserves that defeated rivals Everton 1–0 in the FA Cup at Anfield. Jones scored the winning goal – his first for the club – with a curling strike from 20 yards. At 18 years and 340 days, Jones became the youngest goalscorer in a Merseyside derby since Robbie Fowler scored for Liverpool in 1994. In the next round three weeks later, he opened the scoring in a 2–2 draw at Shrewsbury Town, becoming the first teenager to net in consecutive games for the Reds since Raheem Sterling in April 2014. On 5 February 2020, Jones became Liverpool's youngest ever captain – at 19 years and 5 days – when he captained Liverpool's youngest ever first-team side with an average age of 19 years and 102 days to a 1–0 victory over Shrewsbury in the FA Cup replay at Anfield.

On 4 July 2020, Jones signed a new long-term contract with the club. A day later he scored his first league goal for the club after coming on as a substitute in a 2–0 win over Aston Villa, latching on to Mohamed Salah's header to score past former Liverpool goalkeeper Pepe Reina.

On 22 July, Jones came off the bench against Chelsea for his fifth top-flight appearance in the 2019–20 season with Liverpool, thus qualifying for a Premier League winner's medal. On 30 July, Jones was named the Premier League 2 Player of the Season for 2019–20 ahead of five other nominees: Liam Cullen, Billy Gilmour, Jahmal Hector-Ingram, Nathan Holland and Rayhaan Tulloch.

2020–21 season
After his performances in the 2019–20 season, it was announced that he would wear the number 17 shirt, previously worn by Steven Gerrard and Steve McManaman for the upcoming 2020–21 season. On 24 September, he scored two goals in four minutes against Lincoln City away from home in the EFL Cup and was named Man of the Match by Sky Sports. Due to injuries to star midfielders Jordan Henderson, James Milner, Thiago Alcântara, Naby Keïta and Alex Oxlade-Chamberlain, and Fabinho moving into a makeshift defence, Jones's role in the team increased.

On 1 December 2020, he scored his first UEFA Champions League goal in a 1–0 victory over Ajax, sealing Liverpool's progression into the knockout stages of the competition. On 28 February 2021, Jones scored his first league goal of the season in a 2–0 away win over Sheffield United.

2021–22 season
On 25 September 2021, Jones scored his first goal of the season in a 3–3 away draw againt Brentford. On 28 September, he provided two assists and a key pass in a 5–1 away win over Porto in the Champions League.

2022–23 season
On 17 November 2022, he signed a new long-term contract with Liverpool until June 2027.

International career
On 2 October 2020, Jones received his first call up to the England U21 squad and made his debut in a 3–3 draw against Andorra on 7 October 2020. He scored his first goal for the U21s during a 3–1 win over Andorra U21 at Molineux Stadium on 13 November 2020.

Career statistics

Honours
Liverpool
Premier League: 2019–20
FA Cup: 2021–22
FA Community Shield: 2022
FIFA Club World Cup: 2019

Individual
Premier League 2 Player of the Season: 2019–20
UAE Sports Chain Cup Player of the Tournament: 2019

References

External links

Profile at the Liverpool F.C. website

2001 births
Living people
People from Toxteth
Footballers from Liverpool
English footballers
Association football midfielders
Liverpool F.C. players
Premier League players
England youth international footballers
England under-21 international footballers